The M6 High-Speed Tractor was an artillery tractor used by the US Army during World War II.

Manufactured by Allis-Chalmers, it was used to tow heavy artillery pieces, such as the 8-inch Gun M1 and 240 mm howitzer M1. 
Its G-number was (G-184).

Development 
Although in the late 1930s the US Army lacked a clear mechanization policy, the success of the "blitzkrieg" in 1939-40 highlighted the need of motorized vehicles for both tactical and strategic maneuver, which meant that towed artillery would need to move at a speed comparable to that of the armored fighting vehicles.

To achieve this, a series of “high speed tractors” was planned, which would tow the different artillery pieces existing (or planned) in the US Army inventory. The “high” speed was considered in comparison with horse-drawn artillery rather than that obtainable with wheeled prime movers or ballast tractors. The models considered in the series included: 7 ton, 13 ton, 18 ton, and 38 ton.

Intended to tow heavy artillery pieces as the 240 mm howitzer M1 and the 8-inch Gun M1, the M6 artillery tractor was larger and heavier than the M4 Artillery Tractor, although they had a similar layout. The main differences between both were in the following areas:
 Running Gear (6 running wheels in the M6, instead of 4 wheels in the M4)
 Dimensions
 Weight
 Towing capacity
 Engine

The running gear consisted on six rubber-rimmed wheels per side, with the drive wheel located at the front and a large tensioning wheel at the rear; a layout similar to the one used in the M3 Light Tank and later in the M4 Tractor.

Service history 

The M6 tractor was chiefly used in the European theater only in the last months of World War II.
Until then large caliber artillery was moved by the M1 Heavy Tractor, heavy trucks, or vehicles such as the M33 Prime Mover,  M34 Prime Mover or M35 Prime Mover derived from the M3 Medium Tank, M4 Medium Tank, and M10 GMC hulls respectively

Use of this tractor in the Pacific theater seems to have been limited to training at Oahu, (Hawaii). 

Some vehicles were sold to Israel after being replaced by self-propelled artillery.

Users 
 US Army

Surviving vehicles 
Overloon War Museum, Netherlands

National Military Vehicle Museum, Edinburgh, South Australia

Gallery

See also 
 List of U.S. military vehicles by model number
 List of U.S. military vehicles by supply catalog designation (G184)

 Comparable vehicles
 M4 Tractor
 M5 Tractor

References

Notes

Bibliography

Further reading 
Technical manuals
 SNL G184
 TM 9-2800 1943 Military vehicles
 TM 9-2800 1947
 TM 9-2800-1 1953
 TM 9-788
 TM 9-1785A
 TM 9-1788
 TM 9-1825A
 TM 9-1826C
 TM 9-1827A
 TM 9-1828A
 TM 9-1829A
Books and publications

External links 
 Olive-Drab website, Highspeed M4 (accessed 2014-03-02)

Allis-Chalmers Manufacturing Company
Artillery tractors
Military vehicles introduced from 1940 to 1944
World War II military vehicles
World War II vehicles of the United States
Motor vehicles manufactured in the United States